Tropical Tribute to the Beatles is a tribute album of tropical artists released in 1996 by RMM Records (Ralph Mercado's record company), produced by Oscar Gomez (distributed by Bellaphon & Uni Distribution).

Arrangements were made by Steve Roistein, and lyrics were adapted into Spanish by Jorge Córcega, who had previously adapted the lyrics of Salvatore Adamo.

The concert in New York City at Radio City Music Hall was released on DVD. In 1996 a tour was made through Spain (Plaza de Toros (Valencia), Madrid, A Coruña's Coliseum, Barcelona).

Tracks
"Hey Jude" – Tony Vega 5:28
"Let It Be" – Tito Nieves & Tito Puente 5:17
"Can't Buy Me Love (No Puedes Comprarme)" – Guianko 4:37
"A Hard Day's Night" – Johnny Rivera 4:59
"Ob-La-Di, Ob-La-Da" (adaptado en español) – Celia Cruz 4:42
"The Fool On the Hill" – Ray Sepúlveda 4:28
"I Want to Hold Your Hand" – Manny Manuel (merengue) 4:25
"Day Tripper" – Domingo Quiñones 4:15
"Lady Madonna" (adaptado en español) – Oscar D'León 4:46
"With a Little Help from My Friends (La Ayuda De La Amistad)" – Jesus Enriquez & Miles Peña 5:05
"Yesterday" – Cheo Feliciano 4:51
"And I Love Her (Un Gran Amor Le Di)" – José Alberto "El Canario" (bachata) 3:15
"Come Together (Venir Juntos)" – All singers 5:55

DVD « Live » from Radio City Music Hall 
Isidro Infante y la Orquesta RMM – "Eleanor Rigby" / "Magical Mystery Tour"
Miles Peña / Jorge Enriquez – "With a Little Help from My Friends (La Ayuda De La Amistad)"
Frankie Morales – "A Hard Day's Night"
David Navedo – "Day Tripper"
Guianko – "Can't Buy Me Love (No Puedes Comprarme)"
Ray Sepúlveda – "The Fool On the Hill"
Tito Puente / Tito Nieves – "Let It Be"
José Alberto "El Canario" – "And I Love Her"
Ravel – "I Want to Hold Your Hand (Tu Mano Cogeré)"
Oscar D'León – "Lady Madonna"
Tony Vega – "Hey Jude"
Cheo Feliciano – "Yesterday"
Celia Cruz – "Ob-La-Di, Ob-La-Da"

Musicians
 Steve Roistein – piano, synth
 Ed Calle – saxophone
 Tony Conception – trumpet
 Dana Teboe – trombone
 Rene Luis Toledo – guitar
 Chema Moncillo – bass
 Sammy Timbalon Pagan, Oscar Gomez: percussions
 Cheito Quiñones, Steve Roistein, Oscar Gomez, Rosa Giron, Jose Morato, Juan Canovas: chorus

In the merengue ”I Want to Hold Your Hand (Tu Mano Cogere)”:
 Rafael Rojas – congas
 Yuni Brito – tambora

Chart position

Album

Singles

See also
List of artists who have covered The Beatles

References

External links
ArtistDirect.com
Answers.com
El Mundo
Site about salsa covers

Salsa compilation albums
The Beatles tribute albums
1996 compilation albums
2003 video albums
2003 live albums
Live video albums
RMM Records compilation albums